Thomas Greene (19 January 1794 – 8 August 1872) was a British Peelite, Conservative and Tory politician.

Greene was first elected Tory MP for Lancaster at a by-election in 1824 and held the seat until 1852—becoming a Conservative in 1834, and a Peelite around 1847. He later regained the seat at a by-election in 1853—caused by the unseating of Robert Baynes Armstrong due to corruption and bribery—but stood down at the next election in 1857.

References

External links
 
Parliamentary Archives, Papers of Thomas Greene

UK MPs 1820–1826
UK MPs 1826–1830
UK MPs 1830–1831
UK MPs 1831–1832
UK MPs 1832–1835
UK MPs 1835–1837
UK MPs 1837–1841
UK MPs 1841–1847
UK MPs 1847–1852
UK MPs 1852–1857
1794 births
1872 deaths
Conservative Party (UK) MPs for English constituencies
Tory MPs (pre-1834)